A base period price is the average price for an item in a specified time period used as a base 
for an index, such as 1910–14, 1957–59, 1967, 1977, or 1982.  Time series of data are often 
deflated to a base period price.  Such deflated time series are referred to as constant dollar 
values (versus nominal dollar values).

References 

Pricing